The Greater Portland METRO is a regional public transportation system in Southern Maine. Operated by the Greater Portland Transit District, a transit district comprising Portland, Westbrook, Falmouth, Yarmouth, Freeport, and Brunswick, the system also covers Gorham and the Maine Mall portion of South Portland. METRO was formed in 1966.

METRO is Maine's largest public transportation agency. The transit system's annual ridership was 1,850,686 in 2017.

As of 2016, METRO operated a fleet of eighteen compressed natural gas (CNG) buses and fourteen diesel buses. It operates and maintains the only CNG fuel station in the state of Maine.

History
The ancestor to the METRO, the Portland and Forest Avenue Railroad Co., began operating horse-drawn lines in 1860. They were upgraded to streetcars in 1891, which operated for fifty years before the company switched to buses. The company's new parent, Central Maine Power, sold the buses to Portland Coach Company in 1944.

Concerned about the viability of transit in the region, the Greater Portland Transit District was created in 1966. Three years later it purchased the struggling Portland Coach Company, which became METRO in 1976. Several municipalities serviced by METRO withdrew during an age of contraction; service to Yarmouth and Cape Elizabeth ended in 1978, South Portland withdrew in 1983 (although METRO continues to run select buses to the city), and the Portland School Department began operating its own buses in 1985.

The system began to turnaround in the late 1990s, and in 2004 it expanded to Falmouth, which later joined the Greater Portland Transit District. Portland Public Schools ended yellow school bus transportation for all of Portland's high school students and entered into an agreement with METRO to provide each student with a free unlimited METRO pass starting in 2015. The program has generated 250,000 boardings for the agency while allowing Portland Public Schools greater flexibility with school bell times and repurposing staff and equipment resources to other priorities. Portland charter school Baxter Academy for Technology and Science also offers METRO passes to students.

The METRO BREEZ Express Bus Service started in June 2016. It serves Portland, Falmouth, Yarmouth, Freeport and Brunswick. Two new lines debuted in August 2018 serving Gorham and adding expanded service to Westbrook. New buses with USB ports and Wi-Fi are being introduced into the new Husky and Route 3 lines, as well as bus shelters.

Routes

METRO operates two hubs, one in downtown Portland called the METRO Pulse and one in downtown Westbrook called the Westbrook Hub. Additionally, the Portland Transportation Center, which provides an intercity bus connection and Amtrak service, serves as a major transfer point.

Intercity service from York County connects to the METRO system at the Maine Mall and at several stops along Congress Street. The South Portland Bus Service also connects to METRO at these locations.

Local routes are numbered 1 through 9, with the 9 split into 9A and 9B. There is currently no Route 6. There is one lettered route, the Husky Line, which connects the Gorham and Portland campuses of the University of Southern Maine, which is also identified as "H" on printed maps and signage. There is also one express route, the BREEZ, which runs between Portland and Brunswick; on signage, it is identified as "B".

Fares and accessibility

Fares 
METRO, along with the South Portland Bus Service and Biddeford-Saco-Old Orchard Beach Transit, participates in a regional automated fare collection system known as DiriGo Pass. This system uses the UMO Pass platform developed by Cubic. Monthly, daily, and ten-ride paper passes have been phased out, and are no longer accepted. Instead, passengers load money onto their account and pay fares using a smartcard or the UMO mobile app. Standard fares are $2 for all local service, and $4 for the BREEZ service. Passengers may transfer for free within 90 minutes if using the mobile app or smartcard. If transferring to the BREEZ, passengers pay the difference in fare. A fare capping system has been implemented, so that after $6 in local fares or $12 in BREEZ express fares are paid in a calendar day, no more fares will be charged to the account. Fares are also capped at $60 in a calendar month for local fares, and $120 for BREEZ fares. Reduced fare is half of the normal fare, and the monthly and daily caps are half of the standard caps. Reduced fares are applicable for persons with disabilities, anyone over 65, veterans, youth ages 6–18, and Medicare card holders. Cash continues to be accepted, however no free transfers are available.

Accessibility 
METRO buses are equipped with passenger lifts or ramps and contain space for two riders using wheelchairs. Riders with mobility needs can also use the Regional Transportation Program paratransit service.

See also 
South Portland Bus Service
Downeaster
Biddeford Saco Old Orchard Beach Transit

References

External links
Greater Portland METRO official website

Intercity bus companies of the United States
Bus transportation in Maine
Transportation in Portland, Maine
Portland
Transportation companies based in Maine